Phedikhola is a Village council in Syangja District in Gandaki Province, central Nepal.

History
Phedikhola  was a village development committee in Syangja District in the Gandaki Zone of central Nepal. At the time of the 2011 Nepal census it had a population of 6183 people living in 1645 individual households. On 12 March 2017, the government of Nepal implemented a new local administrative structure consisting of 744 local units. With the implementation of the new local administrative structure, VDCs have been replaced with municipal & village councils. Phedikhola is one of those village councils out of 744 local units. Phedikhola is created by merging Bagephatake, Bhatkhola, Arukharka & Fedikhola itself.

Political situation
Phedikhola is divided into 5 Wards. It is surrounded by Kaski District at northern side, Kaski District from east, Aandhikhola from west and Putalibazar & Aandhikhola at south. Fedikhola is its headquarter.

Population
As Phedikhola is created by merging Bagephadke, Bhatkhola, Arukharka & Fedikhola itself. The sum population of Phedikhola, 12,341, is residing in an area of 56.73 km2.

References

External links
District Coordination Committee Office Syangja, Nepal

See also

Syangja District
Populated places in Syangja District
Rural municipalities in Syangja District
Rural municipalities of Nepal established in 2017